Bhaskar Chakraborty (1945–2005) was a modern Bengali poet and writer.

Life 
Chakraborty was born pre-independence in Kolkata, in Baranagar, the oldest and historic northern part of the city. He eventually died there. He studied in Brahmananda Keshab Chandra College, where he came in contact with Rudraprasad Sengupta, one of the leading personalities of Bengali theater, who professed in the city college. A school teacher by profession, Chakraborty started his literary journey in the decade of 1960s and started writing modern Bengali poetry.

Works

Collection of Poems  
 Shitkal Kabe Asbe Suparna (শীতকাল কবে আসবে সুপর্ণা) [1965-71, published -1971]
 Eso Susangbad Eso (এসো , সুসংবাদ এসো  [1972-78, published - 1981]
 Rastay Abar (রাস্তায় আবার) [1971-80, published - 1983]
 Debotar Sange (দেবতার সঙ্গে) [1982-83, published -1986]
 Akash Angshato Meghla Thakbe (আকাশ অংশত মেঘলা থাকবে) [1981-87, published 1989]
 Swapno Dekhar Mahara (স্বপ্ন দেখার মহড়া) [1986-92, published 1993]
 Tumi Amar Ghum (তুমি আমার ঘুম) [1992-97, published - 1998]
 Neel Ronger Groho (নীল রঙের গ্রহ) [1966-98, published - 1999]
 Selected poems (শ্রেষ্ঠ কবিতা) [2000]
 Kirakam Acho Manushera (কীরকম আছো মানুষেরা) [published - January,2005]
 Jirafer Bhasha (জিরাফের ভাষা) [published -July, 2005]
 Kabita Samagra (কবিতা সমগ্র -দুই খন্ড) [published -2010 ]

Prose 
 Priyo Subrata (প্রিয় সুব্রত)
 Shyanjaan(শয়নযান)
 Vivekananda (বিবেকানন্দ)
 Gadyo Samgra-vol 1 : A collection of prose writings, diary and personal journals (গদ্য সমগ্র- প্রথম খণ্ড : ডায়রি,নোটবই ও অন্যান্য) [published -2013]

Sources

http://www.thestatesman.com/news/notebook/remembering-bhaskar/78164.html
http://eisamay.indiatimes.com/kolkata-collage-kolkattewali/new-town/about-late-poet-bhaskar-chakraborty/articleshow/48124201.cms
http://www.photoarchivesindia.com/images/Autograph-On-Photograph-Shradhanjali.pdf
http://humanitiesunderground.org/bhaskar-chakrabartys-diary-1982-a-selection/
https://web.archive.org/web/20160827232249/http://museindia.com/viewarticle.asp?myr=2005&issid=4&id=121
http://www.photoarchivesindia.com/images/Autograph-On-Photograph-Shradhanjali.pdf
https://www.youtube.com/watch?v=qubGvtRJPd0
https://web.archive.org/web/20160514175906/http://orkut.google.com/c111820259.html

20th-century Bengali poets
1945 births
2005 deaths
21st-century Bengali poets
Bengali male poets
Date of birth missing
Date of death missing
People from Baranagar
Writers from Kolkata
20th-century Indian poets
20th-century Indian male writers